Senator Walden may refer to:

Greg Walden (born 1957), Oregon State Senate
Madison Miner Walden (1836–1891), Iowa State Senate
Alton Waldon (born 1936), New York State Senate